Huai Pong is a village and tambon (sub-district) of Mueang Mae Hong Son District, in Mae Hong Son Province, Thailand. In 2005 it had a population of 7,056 people. The tambon contains 15 villages.

References

Tambon of Mae Hong Son province
Populated places in Mae Hong Son province